The Dover Mall is a shopping mall located on U.S. Route 13 in Dover, Delaware. The anchor stores are Boscov's, Old Navy, Dick's Sporting Goods, JCPenney, and AMC Theatres. There are 2 additional anchor spaces, with one serving as a Macy's fulfillment center since the 2020 holiday season and a vacant anchor spot last occupied by Sears. It is a one-level, enclosed regional mall that is managed by Simon Property Group, who owns 68.1% of it. At , it is the third biggest mall in Delaware, boasting 83 shops and a food court.

Location
The Dover Mall is located along U.S. Route 13 (North Dupont Highway) in the northern part of the city of Dover in Kent County, Delaware, and serves as the only enclosed mall in the Dover area. The mall is situated in a retail corridor and is located just northwest of Dover Motor Speedway and Bally's Dover and across the street from Delaware State University. The Dover Mall is located a short distance south of an interchange with Delaware Route 1. Dover Mall is served by DART First State bus routes 108, 109, and 112, which provide local bus service to points in Dover and Kent County.

Description
The mall is anchored by JCPenney, Macy's, Boscov's, Dick's Sporting Goods, Old Navy, and a vacant anchor spot last occupied by Sears. The Dover Mall also has a food court and a 14-screen AMC Classic. The Dover Mall complex also includes a strip mall called Dover Commons. The Dover Mall offers tax-free shopping and has a trade area that covers the city of Dover and much of Kent County, while also attracting tourists who visit the Dover area.

History 

Built in 1982, the Dover Mall was the second climate-controlled enclosed mall in Dover, following the Blue Hen Mall (now the Blue Hen Corporate Center) a few miles south on Bay Road. The Dover Mall was built as a second mall for the Dover area for Sears and other department stores after Sears was unable to come to an agreement to build a store at the Blue Hen Mall. The opening of the Dover Mall led to the subsequent decline of the Blue Hen Mall. The mall was originally anchored by Boscov's, Leggett, and Sears. The Boscov's store at Dover Mall was the first Boscov's location outside Pennsylvania. 

The mall was renovated in 1992. JCPenney became the mall's fourth department store when it opened in August 1993, relocating from the Blue Hen Mall. Later that year, the Dover Mall became the first shopping mall in the state to ban smoking. Leggett closed its store at the mall on March 15, 1997. It was replaced by Strawbridge's, which opened on November 21, 1997.  During the same time period, Boscov's underwent a substantial renovation and expansion, and Sears completed an interior renovation. In 1999, Carmike Cinemas expanded from six screens to fourteen, and the mall food court was enlarged and renovated. Carmike Cinemas was converted to AMC Classic in 2017.

The Mills Corporation acquired the mall in 2003 from Cadillac Fairview. The mall's Strawbridge's store was converted to Macy's on September 9, 2006 after Federated Department Stores purchased May Department Stores, the owner of Strawbridge's. In April 2007, Simon Property Group acquired the mall along with the other Mills Corp. malls. It is Simon's only Delaware property and at least the third owner since 2000. In 2013, the Dover Mall added several new stores, including a new  Dick's Sporting Goods that opened on November 10, 2013. 

On May 3, 2018, it was announced that the Sears at Dover Mall would be closing as part of a plan to close 42 stores nationwide. Liquidation sales began on May 18, 2018 and the store closed in August 2018. The Sears Auto Center closed by the end of 2018.

On October 15, 2020, Macy's parent company, Macy's, Inc., announced that they would convert the Southwest Plaza in Littleton, Colorado and the Dover Mall Macy's stores into fulfillment centers as online orders spiked during the COVID-19 pandemic.

References

External links

Dover Mall official Website

Shopping malls in Delaware
Shopping malls established in 1982
Simon Property Group
Buildings and structures in Dover, Delaware
Tourist attractions in Dover, Delaware
1982 establishments in Delaware